Fusconaia is a genus of freshwater mussels, aquatic bivalve mollusks in the family Unionidae. They are native to North America.

Species within the genus Fusconaia
Species include:
 Fusconaia askewi
 Fusconaia burkei (Tapered pigtoe)
 Fusconaia cor (Shiny pigtoe)
 Fusconaia cuneolus (Fine-rayed pigtoe pearly mussel)
 Fusconaia escambia (Narrow pigtoe)
 Fusconaia flava (Wabash pigtoe)
 Fusconaia masoni (Atlantic pigtoe)
 Fusconaia mitchelli (False spike)
 Fusconaia ozarkensis
 Fusconaia subrotunda (Long solid mussel)

References

 
Bivalve genera
Taxonomy articles created by Polbot